Brad Lee Pennington (born April 14, 1969) is an American former professional baseball pitcher.

External links 
, or Retrosheet, or Pura Pelota (Venezuelan Winter League)

1969 births
Living people
Allentown Ambassadors players
American expatriate baseball players in Canada
Baltimore Orioles players
Baseball players from Indiana
Bluefield Orioles players
Boston Red Sox players
California Angels players
Cincinnati Reds players
Durham Bulls players
Frederick Keys players
Hagerstown Suns players
Indianapolis Indians players
Kane County Cougars players
Lake Elsinore Storm players
Major League Baseball pitchers
Omaha Royals players
People from Salem, Indiana
Rochester Red Wings players
Syracuse SkyChiefs players
Tampa Bay Devil Rays players
Tiburones de La Guaira players
American expatriate baseball players in Venezuela
Tigres de Aragua players
Vancouver Canadians players
Vincennes Trailblazers baseball players
Wausau Timbers players
Wichita Wranglers players